João Vítor de Oliveira (born 15 May 1992) is a Brazilian hurdler. He competed in the 110 metres hurdles event at the 2015 World Championships in Beijing reaching the semifinals. His personal best in the 110 metres hurdles is 13.45 seconds (8.2 m/s), set in Beijing in 2015.

Competition record

References

External links
 

1992 births
Living people
People from Marília
Brazilian male hurdlers
World Athletics Championships athletes for Brazil
Athletes (track and field) at the 2016 Summer Olympics
Olympic athletes of Brazil
S.L. Benfica athletes
Sportspeople from São Paulo (state)
Athletes (track and field) at the 2022 Mediterranean Games
Mediterranean Games competitors for Portugal
21st-century Brazilian people